IBF, or International Boxing Federation, is one of several boxing organisations.

IBF may also refer to:

Businesses
International Banking Facility, a legal entity of a US bank
Irish Banking Federation, a banking representative body in Ireland
International Broadcasting Facilities, a film and music Electronic Press Kit company in London

Sports
 International Bandy Federation, former name of Federation of International Bandy (FIB), the international governing body for bandy
 International Badminton Federation, former name of Badminton World Federation (BWF), the international governing body for badminton
 International Bowling Federation
Iran Basketball Federation, a basketball league in Iran